Anne Capron (born 18 February 1969) is a former synchronized swimmer from France.

International competitions

References 

1969 births
Living people
Swimmers from Paris
French synchronized swimmers
Olympic synchronized swimmers of France
Synchronized swimmers at the 1988 Summer Olympics
Synchronized swimmers at the 1992 Summer Olympics
Synchronized swimmers at the 1991 World Aquatics Championships
Synchronized swimming coaches